Mee Raqsam is an Indian drama produced and directed by Baba Azmi. Written by Safdar Mir and Husain Mir, the film tells the story of a young Muslim girl who wants to become a dancer. It stars Naseeruddin Shah, Aditi Subedi, Danish Husain, Shraddha Kaul and Rakesh Chaturvedi Om in lead roles. Mee Raqsam was released on ZEE5 on 21 August 2020.

Plot
The film shows a moving bond between father-daughter. Classical dance is the love of the girl's life and also becomes a weapon that defeats restrictive forces of society.The courage of a traditional Muslim who chooses his daughter's desire over obedience to his traditional minded elders. Mee Raqsam was filmed in Kaifi Azmi's native village of Mijwan in Azamgarh district.

Cast
 Naseeruddin Shah as Hashim Seth
 Aditi Subedi as Mariam
 Danish Husain as Salim
 Shraddha Kaul as Zehra Khala
 Rakesh Chaturvedi Om as Mr. Jai Prakash
 Vikas Kumar Yadav as Chandu Bhaiya

Reception 
Shubhra Gupta of The Indian Express called it an "important film, whose heart is firmly in the right place, lighter on its feet." Shruti Shiksha of Zee News wrote: "Mee Raqsam seems contended being functional while telling its story and putting a rather simplistic message across." Soumya Srivastava of Hindustan Times mentioned that ‘'It's heart is in the right place'’ and some parts of the movie are going to stay with us for a long time." Nandini Ramnath of Scroll.in mentioned that "even though the conflict isn't particularly novel, Azmi's interpretation has given it layers".

References

External links
 
 Mee Raqsam on ZEE5

ZEE5 original films
2020 direct-to-video films
2020 films
2020 drama films
Indian drama films
2020s Hindi-language films
Hindi-language drama films
Films set in Uttar Pradesh
Indian dance films